Stefan Mohr (born 22 October 1967) is a German chess grandmaster (GM). Mohr earned the GM title in 1989. He shared third place at Budapest 1989.  He was also second board reserve for bronze medal winning German team at the 1989 European Team Chess Championship.

External links

Mohr, Stefan team chess record at olimpbase.org

1967 births
Living people
Chess grandmasters
German chess players
Place of birth missing (living people)
20th-century German people